The Assam women's cricket team is a women's cricket team that represents the Indian state of Assam. The team competes in the Women's Senior One Day Trophy and the Women's Senior T20 Trophy.

Current squad

 Priyanka Boruah
 Gayatri Gurung
 Hiramoni Saikia
 Papori Gogoi
 Monikha Das
 Sapna Choudhary (wk)
 Ruhina Pegu
 Genevie Pando
 Anamika Bori
 Rashmi Dey
 Mousumi Narah
 Nibedita Baruah
 Jintimani Kalita
 Rekharani Bora
 Maina Narah

See also
 Assam cricket team

References

Cricket in Assam
Women's cricket teams in India